Marin Perić (born 17 October 1990) is a Croatian footballer.

Career
Perić had a spell with Austrian Regionalliga side Allerheiligen and returned to NK Krk in September 2019. However, he left the club again at the end of the year.

References

External links
PrvaLiga profile 
Soccerway profile

1990 births
Living people
Soccer players from Montreal
Croatian footballers
Association football wingers
Association football forwards
NK Krk players
NK Grobničan players
NK Pomorac 1921 players
NK Zavrč players
NK Krka players
HNK Zmaj Makarska players
NK Krško players
Slovenian PrvaLiga players
Austrian Regionalliga players
Croatian expatriate footballers
Expatriate footballers in Iran
Croatian expatriate sportspeople in Iran
Expatriate footballers in Slovenia
Croatian expatriate sportspeople in Slovenia
Expatriate footballers in Austria
Croatian expatriate sportspeople in Austria